Euroa in Phoenicia (also spelled Eurœa in Phœnicia) is a former city, which also hosted a bishopric. It remains a Latin Catholic titular see

History 
Euoea in Phoenicia, located in modern Syria, was important enough in the Roman province of Phoenicia Secunda to become a suffragan bishopric of the Metropolitan of Damascus, but it faded.

Titular see 
The diocese was nominally restored as a Latin titular bishopric in 1737 as Evaria, which name was changed to Euhara in 1925, Euaria in 1929 and finally Euroea in Phoenicia in 1933.

It is vacant, having had the following incumbents, of the lowest (episcopal) rank with a single intermediary-rank (archiepiscopal) exception:
 Titular Bishop Hernando Eusebio Oscot y Colombres, Dominican Order (O.P.) (1737.10.01 – 1743.11.28)
 Titular Bishop Franciszek Kazimierz Dowgiałło Zawisza (1744.04.13 – 1766)
 Titular Bishop Antonius Urbański (1769.09.11 – 1770)
 Titular Bishop Józef Ignacy Rybiński (1774.02.28 – 1777.06.23)
 Titular Bishop Antoni Narzymski (1778.07.20 – 1799.12.10)
 Titular Bishop Nikolaus Rauscher (1808.03.16 – 1815)
 Titular Bishop Johann Baptist Judas Thaddeus von Keller (1816.07.22 – 1828.01.28)
 Titular Bishop Johann Amberg (1865.09.25 – 1882.03.16)
 Titular Bishop José Joaquín Isaza Ruiz (1869.11.22 – 1873.03.29)
 Titular Bishop, Bishop-elect Paul-François-Marie Goethals, Jesuits (S.J.) (1878.01.15 – 1878.02.03), Apostolic Vicar of Western Bengal (India) (1877.12.03 – 1886.09.01); later Titular Archbishop of Hierapolis (1878.02.03 – 1886.09.01), finally Metropolitan Archbishop of Calcutta (India) (1886.09.01 – 1901.07.04)
 Titular Bishop Jean-Pierre Boyer (1878.07.15 – 1879.12.24), later Cardinal-Priest of SS. Trinità al Monte Pincio 
 Titular Bishop Raffaele Mezzetti (1880.08.20 – 1881)
 Titular Archbishop Thomas Hyland, O.P. (1882.03.10 – 1884.10.09)
 Titular Bishop Johann Zobl (1885.03.27 – 1907.09.13)
 Titular Bishop Jan Feliks Cieplak (1908.07.12 – 1919.03.28), Auxiliary Bishop of Mohilev (Belarus) (1908.07.12 – 1925.12.14), became Titular Archbishop of Acrida (1919.03.28 – 1925.12.14); also Apostolic Administrator of the above Mohilev (Belarus) (1923.07.05 – 1925.12.14), later Metropolitan Archbishop of Vilnius (Lithuania) (1925.12.14 – 1926.02.17)
 Titular Bishop Antonio Maria Capettini (康道華), Pontifical Institute for Foreign Missions (P.I.M.E.) (1919.04.07 – 1958.07.06)
 Titular Bishop Edoardo Piana Agostinetti (1958.07.21 – 1976.01.14)

Source and External links 
 GigaCatholic with titular incumbent biography links

Catholic titular sees in Asia
Phoenician cities